First Baptist Church, originally known as Lexington African Baptist Church, is a historic Baptist church building in the city of Lexington, Virginia, United States.  It was built between 1894 and 1896, and is a large brick church on a limestone basement in the Gothic Revival style.  It has a front gable roof, round and lancet-arch stained glass windows, and towers at its two front corners.  The right hand tower has a belfry and spire.  The interior consists of a barrel-vaulted auditorium with a gallery on turned posts and the basement has classroom and meeting spaces. Historically First Baptist played a central role in the life of Lexington's African-American community.

It was listed on the National Register of Historic Places in 2006.

References

External links
First Baptist Church Facebook page

African-American history of Virginia
19th-century Baptist churches in the United States
Churches on the National Register of Historic Places in Virginia
Baptist churches in Virginia
Gothic Revival church buildings in Virginia
Churches completed in 1896
Churches in Lexington, Virginia
National Register of Historic Places in Lexington, Virginia